John Joseph Sirica (March 19, 1904 – August 14, 1992) was a United States district judge of the United States District Court for the District of Columbia, where he became famous for his role in the trials stemming from the Watergate scandal.

Early life and education

Sirica was born in Waterbury, Connecticut, to Ferdinando (Fred) Sirica, an immigrant from Italy, and Rose (Zinno) Sirica, whose parents were from Italy. Between 1910 and 1918, the Sirica family lived in various cities across the United States, while Fred worked as a barber and made several unsuccessful attempts at running small businesses. The family moved to Washington, D.C., in 1918, where John attended Emerson Preparatory School and eventually transferred to Columbia Preparatory School. In 1922, Fred was running a two-lane bowling alley and poolhall, which was raided by the police for violation of the Prohibition-era Volstead Act when liquor was found in the restroom. Fred was arrested, but the charges were dropped. He soon sold the business and moved away.
Meanwhile, John went directly from high school to law school, which was possible in the District of Columbia at the time, and, after two false starts, entered Georgetown Law and received a Bachelor of Laws in 1926.

Career
Sirica fought as a boxer in Washington and Miami in the 1920s and 1930s. He was torn between a career as a fighter and the career in law that he followed after earning a law degree and passing the bar. Boxing champion Jack Dempsey became a close friend. Sirica was in private practice of law in Washington, D.C. from 1926 to 1930. He was an Assistant United States Attorney for the District of Columbia from 1930 to 1934, and subsequently returned to private practice from 1934 to 1957. He also served as general counsel to the House Select Committee to Investigate the Federal Communications Commission in 1944; his appointment was opposed by the two Republican members of the committee. However, Sirica resigned in protest over the committee's handling of the WMCA radio scandal that year, and re-entered private practice. In 1947, he joined the law firm of Hogan and Hartson in Washington, D.C. (now called Hogan Lovells).

Federal judicial service
Sirica was nominated by President Dwight D. Eisenhower on February 25, 1957, to a seat on the United States District Court for the District of Columbia vacated by Judge Henry Albert Schweinhaut. He was confirmed by the United States Senate on March 26, 1957, and received his commission on March 28, 1957. He served as Chief Judge and a member of the Judicial Conference of the United States from 1971 to 1974. He assumed senior status on October 31, 1977. His service terminated on August 14, 1992, due to his death.

Notably, he ruled the law banning Navy women from ships to be unconstitutional in the case Owens v. Brown.

Watergate

Sirica rose to national prominence when he ordered President Richard Nixon to turn over his recordings of White House conversations. Sirica's involvement in the case began when he presided over the trial of the Watergate burglars. He did not believe the claim that they had acted alone, and through the use of provisional sentencing strongly encouraged them to give information about higher-ups before final sentencing. Under provisional sentencing, judges could give defendants a few months to ponder their sentence before it became final. One defendant, James W. McCord Jr., wrote a letter describing a broader scheme of involvement by people in the Nixon administration.

Judicial demeanor
Experienced as a trial lawyer, Sirica was known for his "no-nonsense" demeanor on the bench. His critics said he lacked understanding of people and compassion, that he was guilty of careless legal errors, that he had a misguided view of the purposes of judicial power. Most of all, they attacked him for his handling of the Watergate trial.  He was nicknamed "Maximum John" for giving defendants the maximum sentence that guidelines allowed.

Book
In 1979, Sirica published a book, co-authored with John Stacks, detailing his participation in the Watergate cases under the title To Set the Record Straight.

Renata Adler was assigned to review the book for The New Yorker but declined, recounting in her book Gone: The Last Days of The New Yorker that she had found that “contrary to his reputation as a hero, Sirica was in fact a corrupt, incompetent, and dishonest figure, with a close connection to Senator Joseph McCarthy and clear ties to organized crime.”  When challenged by Sirica's son and several articles in The New York Times to substantiate this statement she wrote a detailed article published in Harper's, detailing his connections to bootlegging and illegal boxing, as well as the animosity of The New York Times brought on by her statement.

Recognition

For his role in uncovering the truth about Watergate, Sirica was named Time magazine's Man of the Year in January 1974.

In 1977, he received the Golden Plate Award of the American Academy of Achievement presented by Awards Council member Leon Jaworski.

Death
Sirica suffered a severe heart attack while at a speaking engagement on February 5, 1976. In the final years of his life, Sirica suffered from a wide range of ailments, both minor and severe. In the last few weeks of his life, he came down with pneumonia. He fell and broke his collarbone a few days before his death, and was hospitalized at Georgetown University Medical Center in Washington, D.C. He died in the hospital of cardiac arrest at 4:30 p.m. on August 14, 1992. He was interred at Gate of Heaven Cemetery in Silver Spring, Maryland. Sirica was survived by his wife, Lucile Camalier Sirica, and his three children, John Jr., Patricia, and Eileen.

Bibliography

References

External links
 Washington Post biography
 New York Times biography
 Time Magazine 1973 Man of the Year Biography
 Watergate trial sketches, with Judge Sirica
 
 Finding aid to the John J. Sirica papers at the Library of Congress

1904 births
1992 deaths
Georgetown University Law Center alumni
Judges of the United States District Court for the District of Columbia
Writers from Waterbury, Connecticut
Boxers from Connecticut
United States district court judges appointed by Dwight D. Eisenhower
20th-century American judges
Washington, D.C., Republicans
Burials at Gate of Heaven Cemetery (Silver Spring, Maryland)
20th-century American lawyers
Watergate scandal investigators
Assistant United States Attorneys
People associated with Hogan Lovells
Time Person of the Year
American people of Italian descent